Capitol View is an unincorporated part of Richland County, South Carolina, United States, consisting of several neighborhoods that are next to the city of Columbia, the state capital. The area was first listed as a census-designated place (CDP) prior to the 2020 census. In 2020 its population was 4,653.

Geography
The CDP is in central Richland County and is bordered to the north, west, and south by the city of Columbia. It is bordered to the east by Mill Creek and Sun View Lake, a reservoir on the creek, which is a south-flowing tributary of the Congaree River. The CDP consists of the neighborhoods of Village Bond, Capitol View, and Hazelwood Acres in the northwest; Charlestown in the northeast; and Eastmont in the south. The northwest and northeast arms of the CDP are separated by the neighborhoods of Galaxy and Strathaven Forest, both within the Columbia city limits.

South Carolina Highway 262 (Leesburg Road) runs through the northern side of the CDP, leading west  to Interstate 77 at Exit 9 and east  along the southern edge of Fort Jackson to U.S. Route 601. U.S. Routes 76 and 378 (Garners Ferry Road) forms the southern edge of the CDP, leading northwest  to downtown Columbia and east  to Sumter.

2020 census

Note: the US Census treats Hispanic/Latino as an ethnic category. This table excludes Latinos from the racial categories and assigns them to a separate category. Hispanics/Latinos can be of any race.

References 

Census-designated places in Richland County, South Carolina
Census-designated places in South Carolina